Acharya Vishwanath Baitha is an Indian politician and member of the Bharatiya Janata Party. Baitha was a member of the Bihar Legislative Assembly from the Bhore constituency in Gopalganj district.

References 

People from Gopalganj district, India
Bharatiya Janata Party politicians from Bihar
Members of the Bihar Legislative Assembly
Living people
21st-century Indian politicians
Year of birth missing (living people)